Kurimetsa Nature Reserve is a nature reserve which is located in Viljandi County, Estonia.

The area of the nature reserve is 52 ha.

The protected area was founded in 1998 to protect valuable habitat types and threatened species in Ainja and Sudiste village (both in Mulgi Parish).

References

Nature reserves in Estonia
Geography of Viljandi County